Below are lists of films produced in Egypt in the 1980s.

List of Egyptian films of 1980
List of Egyptian films of 1981
List of Egyptian films of 1982
List of Egyptian films of 1983
List of Egyptian films of 1984
List of Egyptian films of 1985
List of Egyptian films of 1986
List of Egyptian films of 1987
List of Egyptian films of 1988
List of Egyptian films of 1989

External links
 Egyptian films at the Internet Movie Database

1980s
Egypt